FNHS may refer to:
 French National Honor Society (disambiguation)
 Niederhöchstadt station, in Germany

See also 
 FNH (disambiguation)